Odanga is a surname. Notable people with the surname include:

Donald Odanga (died 2008), Kenyan basketball player
Joshua Shidambasi Odanga (1924–2016), Kenyan diplomat

Surnames of Kenyan origin